Wave is the fourth and final studio album by the Patti Smith Group. It was released on May 17, 1979, by Arista Records. Produced by Todd Rundgren, the album continued the band's move towards more radio-friendly mainstream pop rock sound. Wave garnered a mixed reception from music critics and was less successful than its predecessor, Easter (1978). However, the songs "Frederick" and "Dancing Barefoot" both received commercial airplay. Following the album's release, the band disbanded, and frontwoman Patti Smith pursued a solo career nine years later with Dream of Life (1988).

Background and release 

The title track was a tribute to Pope John Paul I, whose brief papacy coincided with the recording sessions of Wave. The first single of the album was "Frederick", a love song for frontwoman Patti Smith's fiancé Fred "Sonic" Smith with a melody and structure bearing a resemblance to "Because the Night", the group's biggest hit. Smith began writing the lyrics of second single "Dancing Barefoot" in late 1978 and recorded it in 1979. The song was described as "a swirling, seductive love song" that uses "love-as-addiction" metaphors and wordplay with the words "heroine" and "heroin". Smith stated she was told to replace the word "heroine" with a synonym because of issues with radio airplay, but she objected the decision since she actually intended the lyric to reference the female equivalent of hero. Rolling Stone ranked the song number 323 on their 2004 list of the "500 Greatest Songs of All Time". Both songs received commercial airplay. A cover of the Byrds' "So You Want to Be (A Rock 'n' Roll Star)" was released as the album's third and final single.

After Wave was released, the band disbanded in fall 1979 when finishing their last concert in Florence, Italy. Patti married Fred on March 1, 1980 and spent many years in semi-retirement from music following the birth of their children, Jesse and Jackson, until her return as a solo singer with Dream of Life (1988). The 1996 remaster of Wave includes Smith's original version of "Fire of Unknown Origin". Blue Öyster Cult's version was released on their album of the same name in 1981. The back cover of the original LP bore a quote from the Jean Genet poem "Le Condamné à mort".

Critical reception 

Upon its release in 1979, Wave garnered mixed reviews, attracting either positive or negative commentary on its polished production and conventionality. In Christgau's Record Guide: Rock Albums of the Seventies (1981), Robert Christgau found the album "quirkier than the more generally satisfying Easter and praised "Dancing Barefoot" and the title track. However, he dismissed "Seven Ways of Going" and "Broken Flag" as "unlistable [and less interesting than]" the band's 1976 album Radio Ethiopia. Tom Carson of Rolling Stone also negatively likenened Wave to Radio Ethiopia, concluding that the record "is too confused and hermetically smug to be much more than an interesting failure." Simon Frith of Melody Maker was more appreciative of the album, praising Rundgren's hand in the production and considered the songs to represent a newfound focus for Smith and the band.

AllMusic's William Ruhlmann noted that Smith "achieves a sense of charm and sincerity on Wave that she hadn't even attempted on her earlier albums" but lamented that "the overall mediocre quality of the material makes this the slightest of Smith's efforts." In a 2019 review for PopMatters, Matt McKinzie dubbed the album as the singer's "most unapologetically-pop effort" where she "reject[s] the idea that her genre capabilities begin and end with th[e] four-letter word [punk]." Emma Johnston, a writer from Louder Sound, ranked Wave number 6 on a list of Patti Smith's best albums, writing that it was "Smith at her least filtered and most emotionally open, and remains something of an underrated treasure."

"Broken Flag" is the 1980s featured music track that accompanies the period spy thriller The Americans, in Season 6 episode 'Harvest' aired on May 9, 2018, accompanying the scene where Elizabeth and Philip dispose of body parts approximately 30 minutes into the episode.

Track listing 

Note
 On some vinyl releases "So You Want to Be (A Rock 'n' Roll Star)" and "Citizen Ship" swapped places.

Personnel 
Patti Smith Group
 Jay Dee Daugherty – drums, consultant
 Lenny Kaye – guitar, bass guitar on "Wave", vocals
 Ivan Kral – bass guitar, guitar, cello on "Wave", keyboards
 Richard Sohl – piano, ocean effects on "Wave"
 Patti Smith – vocals, piano on "Wave"

Additional musicians
 Andi Ostrowe – percussion, timpani on "Seven Ways of Going"
 Todd Rundgren – bass guitar on "Dancing Barefoot", production, engineering

Technical
Thom Panunzio and Patti Smith Group - production on "54321/Wave", recorded live in New York, May 23, 1979
 Vic Anesini – mastering
 George Carnell – assistant engineer
 Tom Edmonds – assistant engineer
Robert Mapplethorpe - art direction, photography

Charts

Certifications and sales

Release history

Notes

External links 
 

Patti Smith albums
1979 albums
Arista Records albums
Albums produced by Todd Rundgren